Admission may refer to:

Arts and media
"Admissions" (CSI: NY), an episode of CSI: NY
Admissions (film), a 2011 short film starring James Cromwell
Admission (film), a 2013 comedy film
Admission, a 2019 album by Florida sludge metal band Torche
Admission (novel), a 2020 novel by Julie Buxbaum

Legal proceedings
Admission (law), a statement that may be used in court against the person making it
Acceptance of admissible evidence in court
The process of official inclusion in a state, the opposite of secession

Status granted to a person
University and college admission
Admission to the bar, change in status allowing an applicant to become part of a profession

Other uses
The process by which patients enter into inpatient care
Admittance, the inverse of impedance

See also
Admissibility (disambiguation)
List of U.S. states by date of admission to the Union